Memar Ajami is a Baku Metro station. It was opened on 31 December 1985. It was formerly called Mikrorayon and is named after Ajami Nakhchivani. It became a transfer station to the Purple Line on 19 April 2016.

See also
List of Baku metro stations

References

Baku Metro stations
Railway stations opened in 1985
Railway stations opened in 2016
1985 establishments in Azerbaijan
2016 establishments in Azerbaijan